Chamaesphecia schwingenschussi is a moth of the family Sesiidae. It is found in Turkey, Transcaucasia and Iran.

The larvae feed on Thymus species.

References

Moths described in 1937
Sesiidae